Pure Prairie League is the self-titled debut album by American country rock band Pure Prairie League, released in 1972.

Track listing
"Tears" (Craig Fuller) – 2:43
"Take It Before You Go" (Fuller) – 4:05
"You're Between Me" (Fuller) – 5:35
"Woman" (Adam Taylor) – 3:40
"Doc's Tune" (George Powell) – 1:22
"Country Song" (T. P. Waterhouse) – 7:37
"Harmony Song" (Fuller) – 5:20
"It's All on Me" (Powell) – 2:30

Personnel
Pure Prairie League
Craig Fuller – lead guitar, vocals
George Powell – finger-style guitar, rhythm guitar, vocals
Jim Lanham – bass guitar, background vocals
John David Call – steel guitar
Jim Caughlan – drums
Additional personnel

Hugh McCracken – guitar
Barbara Merrick - vocals
Starr Smith – vocals
James "Westy" Westermeyer – vocals

Production
Producer: Bob Ringe
Engineer: Gus Mossler
Cover Art: Norman Rockwell

References

Pure Prairie League albums
1972 debut albums
RCA Records albums